Zamia pseudoparasitica is a species of plant in the family Zamiaceae. It is endemic to Panama.  Its natural habitat is subtropical or tropical moist lowland forests on the Atlantic side of the isthmus. It is threatened by habitat loss.

Zamia pseudoparasitica is the only known species of Zamia that is epiphytic, growing on the branches of forest trees. It has a very short trunk but long leaves over 3 m long. Seeds are orange, thought to be disseminated by northern olingo,Toucans or by bats. Some attempts have been made to bring the plant into cultivation as a plant to be grown in a hanging basket, with some degree of success.

References

Flora of Panama
pseudoparasitica
Near threatened plants
Epiphytes
Taxonomy articles created by Polbot